Yacouba Songné (born 10 January 1997 in Burkina Faso) is a professional football player. He currently plays for Young Africains as a striker.

Professional career 
Songné began his professional football career in 2016 when he joined Étoile Filante de Ouagadougou in Burkina Faso. In January 2018 he was transferred to Asante Kotoko S.C. where he currently plays. In May 2018, he was voted player of the month in Asante Kotoko.

References 

1992 births
Living people
Burkinabé Premier League players
Burkinabé footballers
Asante Kotoko S.C. players
Association football forwards
21st-century Burkinabé people
Tanzanian Premier League players